Saybrook-on-the-Lake is an unincorporated community and census-designated place (CDP) on the shore of Lake Erie in Ashtabula County, Ohio, United States. It was first listed as a CDP prior to the 2020 census.

The CDP is in northern Ashtabula County, in the northwest corner of Saybrook Township. It is bordered to the north by Lake Erie, to the west by Geneva Township, and to the east by Ohio State Route 45. State Route 531 is the main road through the community, paralleling the lakeshore and leading east-northeast  to Ashtabula Harbour and west-southwest  to Geneva-on-the-Lake.

Demographics

References 

Census-designated places in Ashtabula County, Ohio
Census-designated places in Ohio